Yuriy Borisovich Dyachkov (born 13 July 1940) is a retired Soviet decathlete. He competed at the 1960 Summer Olympics but failed to finish. He placed sixth at the 1962 European Championships and won the national title in 1965 and 1966. Dyachkov is the son of the Olympic discus thrower Nina Dumbadze and athletics coach Boris Dyachkov.

References

1940 births
Living people
Sportspeople from Tbilisi 
Athletes (track and field) at the 1960 Summer Olympics
Olympic athletes of the Soviet Union
Soviet decathletes
Decathletes from Georgia (country)
Dynamo sports society athletes